The following are the records of Uruguay in Olympic weightlifting. Records are maintained in each weight class for the snatch lift, clean and jerk lift, and the total for both lifts by the Federacion Uruguaya de Pesas.

Men

Women

References

Uruguayan
Olympic weightlifting
records
weightlifting